Han Ying (born 29 April 1983 as ) is a female table tennis player representing Germany since 2010. A specialist in defensive chopping, a style in decline ever since the mid-1990s, she is one of a few surviving defensive players active at the ITTF World Tour level as of 2021.

Her most important achievement are the Olympic silver medal in women's team in 2016 and the fourth place in the same event in 2020. Other major awards include the second place in the 2016 World Tour Grand Finals and the fourth place in the 2020 Women's World Cup.

Career

Childhood training
Han was born in Shenyang, Liaoning, China. In her childhood, she played as an attacker with little progress. In an effort to qualify for the top team in Shenyang, her father convinced her to switch to a defensive chopper. She plays defensively ever since.

She left China at the age of 19 as her style was losing popularity in China. According to her, the China national table tennis team only had three spots reserved for defenders. These defenders almost have no opportunity to play in international tournaments, instead, they serve as internal training partners for the Chinese attackers.

Breakthrough in Germany
Han played for the German club Turnverein Busenbach from 2002 to 2005. She transferred to another German club, MTV Tostedt, from 2005 to 2012.

She became a naturalized German citizen in 2010.

She took a break from her career as she gave birth in October 2012. Since April 2013, she relocated to Düsseldorf and played for the Polish club KTS Tarnobrzeg.

Major competitions

Han debuted in the Olympics at the age of 33. As the fifth seed in the singles in the 2016 Olympics, she was defeated 0-4 in the quarterfinal by Ding Ning, the eventual gold medalist. In the women's team, she helped Germany to defeat Japan in the semifinal before losing to China to claim an Olympic silver medal. In the team semifinal, she lost 2-3 to Kasumi Ishikawa but she recovered to defeat Ai Fukuhara 3-2. In the team final she lost 0-3 to Li Xiaoxia.

In the 2016 ITTF World Tour Grand Finals, she claimed the second place by beating Mima Ito 4-2, Miu Hirano 4-0 and losing to Zhu Yuling 0-4.

In the 2020 ITTF Women's World Cup, she claimed the fourth place by beating Cheng I-ching 4-2, losing to Chen Meng 3-4 and losing to Mima Ito 0-4.

In the 2020 Olympics, she reached quarterfinal of the women's singles by beating Feng Tianwei 4-1 and losing to Sun Yingsha 0-4.

Personal life
Han married Yang Lei, a German table tennis player from China, in 2006. On 2012, she gave birth to her daughter. Han and her family currently reside in Düsseldorf.

Statistics

References

External links 
 
 
 
 
 

1983 births
Living people
German female table tennis players
Chinese emigrants to Germany
Table tennis players at the 2015 European Games
Table tennis players at the 2019 European Games
European Games medalists in table tennis
European Games gold medalists for Germany
European Games silver medalists for Germany
Chinese female table tennis players
Table tennis players at the 2016 Summer Olympics
Table tennis players at the 2020 Summer Olympics
Olympic table tennis players of Germany
Olympic medalists in table tennis
Olympic silver medalists for Germany
Medalists at the 2016 Summer Olympics
Table tennis players from Anshan
Naturalised table tennis players
Naturalized citizens of Germany
Expatriate table tennis people in Japan
German sportspeople of Chinese descent
World Table Tennis Championships medalists